Starr Andrews (born June 23, 2001) is an American figure skater. She is the 2022 Skate Canada International silver medalist, 2019 International Challenge Cup silver medalist, 2019 Egna Trophy silver medalist, and finished fourth at the  2023 U.S. Nationals. She has finished in the top ten at three ISU Championships and is the first African American woman to win a Grand Prix medal in the singles discipline.

Earlier in her career, Andrews is the 2017 U.S. national junior silver medalist.

Personal life 
Starr Andrews was born on June 23, 2001, in Los Angeles, California. She is home-schooled. She has a brother and two sisters — Skylar, a gymnast, and Ashton, a baseball player. Their mother, Toshawa Andrews, has cardiac microvascular disease, which has led to a dozen heart attacks.

Career

Early years 
Andrews became interested in figure skating after her mother brought her to the ice rink when she was three. She recalled in 2018: "I wanted to get on the ice really, really bad, but I was too small, so I had to wait." She began learning to skate in 2005. A video of nine-year-old Andrews skating to Whip My Hair went viral after appearing on YouTube in December 2010. By March 2018, it had reached 53 million views.

Derrick Delmore became her coach around 2013. Andrews placed 6th on the novice level at the 2016 U.S. Championships.

2016–2017 season 
Andrews decided to move up to the junior level, coached by Delmore and Peter Kongkasem in Lakewood, California and Riverside, California. Making her international debut, she won the junior ladies title at the Golden Bear of Zagreb in October 2016.

In January, she received the junior silver medal at the 2017 U.S. Championships. After Amber Glenn withdrew, Andrews was added to the U.S. team to the 2017 World Junior Championships in Taipei, Taiwan. At the event, held in March, she qualified to the final segment by placing ninth in the short program and went on to finish twelfth overall.

2017–2018 season 
Andrews began her season on the junior level, placing fifth at the ISU Junior Grand Prix in Austria. In December, making her senior international debut, she placed sixth at the 2017 CS Golden Spin of Zagreb, where she also obtained the minimum technical scores for both senior-level ISU Championships.

In January, Andrews finished sixth in the senior ladies' category at the 2018 U.S. Championships, having placed eighth in the short program and fifth in the free skate. She was assigned to the 2018 Four Continents, where she placed seventh, and the 2018 World Junior Championships, from which she withdrew. She was replaced by Emmy Ma.

2018–2019 season
In early August, Andrews competed at the 2018 CS Asian Open Figure Skating Trophy; she placed second in the short program with a personal best score but dropped to fifth after the free skate. In September, at the 2018 CS Autumn Classic International, she ranked fifth in the short and seventh overall. She attempted the triple Axel in the free program, but her jump had a two-footed landing and was downgraded due to insufficient rotation. She made her Grand Prix debut in October at the 2018 Skate America and placed ninth in the short program, tenth in the free skate, and tenth overall. She was also invited to the 2018 Skate Canada International, where she placed fourth in the short program, ninth in the free skate, and seventh overall.

Andrews placed eighth at the 2019 U.S. Championships.

2019–2020 season

Beginning on the Challenger series, Andrews placed fifth at both the 2019 CS Lombardia Trophy and the 2019 CS Finlandia Trophy.  On the Grand Prix, Andrews placed fourth in the short program at the 2019 Internationaux de France with a new personal best.  Fifth in the free skate, she placed fifth overall.

Andrews finished sixth at the 2020 U.S. Championships.  Finishing the season at the 2020 World Junior Championships, Andrews placed eighth.

2020–2021 season 
Andrews started her season competing at the ISP Points Challenge, a virtual US domestic competition. At the first opportunity, she placed fourth. She was assigned to compete at the 2020 Skate America in Las Vegas, an event attended only by skaters training in the United States due to the coronavirus pandemic.  She placed eighth.

Competing at the 2021 U.S. Championships, also held in Las Vegas, Andrews placed twelfth.

2021–2022 season 
Beginning the Olympic season on the Challenger series, Andrews placed fifth at the 2021 CS Autumn Classic International.

Following Bradie Tennell's withdrawal from the 2021 Skate America, Andrews was named to replace her. She placed tenth at the event. She finished in fifth at the 2021 CS Cup of Austria. She had to withdraw from the 2021 Internationaux de France due to an injury in the warmup.

Andrews finished ninth at the 2022 U.S. Championships. This result earned her an assignment to the 2022 Four Continents Championships, where she came ninth as well.

2022–2023 season 
Andrews finished in sixth place at the 2022 CS Nebelhorn Trophy to start the season. At her first Grand Prix assignment, the 2022 Skate Canada International, she finished fifth in the short program in a close field. She then "surprised" many by finishing second in the free skate, rising to take the silver medal. She became the first African American woman to medal in singles in the Grand Prix era that began in 1995, and the second Black woman after Frenchwoman Surya Bonaly. Andrews noted the significance, saying "it is a huge deal for me. I am one of the few people of color in the sport, and to bring home a medal is even more special." Heading into the 2022 NHK Trophy, she planned to add a second flip to her free skate, having recovered from an ankle "tweak" that had necessitated lessening her content in the early events. Fifth in the short program, she dropped to ninth after the free skate, where she singled her planned second flip.

At the 2023 U.S. Championships, Andrews placed narrowly third in the short program. In the free skate she made two jump errors and was overtaken for the bronze medal by Amber Glenn, but still won the pewter medal and stood on the senior podium for the first time in her career. She was the first African-American woman to stand on the US podium since Debi Thomas in 1988, which Andrews acknowledged as "amazing."

Programs

Competitive highlights 
GP: Grand Prix; CS: Challenger Series; JGP: Junior Grand Prix

Detailed results

Senior level 
ISU Personal best highlighted in bold.

Junior level

References

External links 
 
 

2001 births
American female single skaters
Living people
Figure skaters from Los Angeles
21st-century American women